The red-fronted prinia (Prinia rufifrons), also known as the red-fronted warbler and the red-faced apalis, is a species of bird in the family Cisticolidae.
It is found in Chad, Djibouti, Eritrea, Ethiopia, Kenya, Somalia, Sudan, Tanzania, and Uganda.
Its natural habitat is dry savanna.

Taxonomy
The red-fronted prinia was described by the German naturalist Eduard Rüppell in 1840 under the binomial name Prinia rufifrons. The type locality is Eritrea (the coastal region of Abyssinia). The specific epithet rufifrons comes from the Latin rufus for "red" and frons for "forehead" or "front".

There are three subspecies:
 P. r. rufifrons Rüppell, 1840 – Chad to northwest Somalia
 P. r. smithi (Sharpe, 1895) – southeast Sudan to central Somalia and north Tanzania
 P. r. rufidorsalis (Sharpe, 1897) – southeast Kenya

Many taxonomists place this species in the genus Prinia rather than in its own monotypic genus Urorhipis. Support for this alternative placement is provided by a molecular phylogenetic study of the Cisticolidae published in 2013 that found that the red-fronted warbler was closely related to the prinias.

References

Ryan, Peter (2006). Family Cisticolidae (Cisticolas and allies). pp. 378–492 in del Hoyo J., Elliott A. & Christie D.A. (2006) Handbook of the Birds of the World. Volume 11. Old World Flycatchers to Old World Warblers'' Lynx Edicions, Barcelona 

red-fronted prinia
Birds of the Horn of Africa
red-fronted prinia
Taxonomy articles created by Polbot